Ji Hyung-jin (born 25 May 1994) is a Korean handball player for the SK Hawks and the South Korea men's national handball team and was a player for the Kyung Hee University and the Korean national team.

He represented Korea at the 2019 World Men's Handball Championship.

References

1994 births
Living people
Korean male handball players